Francis Frost may refer to:

 Francis Theodore Frost (1843–1916), Canadian manufacturer and politician
 Francis Seth Frost (1825–1902), painter, photographer and businessman

See also
 Frank Frost (disambiguation)